is a Filipina jazz vocalist from Manila, Philippines mainly active in Japan. Her real name has been cited as Marlene dela Peña or Marlene Pena Lim. Marlene moved to Japan in the late 1970s and released her first single through EMI Japan in 1979 before signing a contract with CBS Sony in 1981, recording albums twice a year. In 1983 two of her albums appeared on the Oricon charts. Deja Vu reached #8, while Magic (sometimes listed as It's Magic in English) reached #5, each enjoying sales of over 150,000 records.

In the United States, Marlene is known for her work with Seawind, with whom she recorded her second album Summer Nights in Los Angeles in 1982. and her album Stay With Me which reached No. 28 in the Billboard Adult Contemporary Chart in the 90’s. Her sixth album, Looking for Love, was also recorded in Los Angeles in 1984. With the Mal Waldron/Billy Holiday composition Left alone recorded on the soundtrack of the Haruki Kadokawa movie Kyabare (Cabaret) she scored a hit in Japan in 1986. She has recorded 31 albums in total so far and is the highest paid Pinay jazz artist in Japan. In 2016 she teamed up with Jiro Yoshida, Makoto Kuriya and released the album Cubic Magic under the group name Threesome, followed by the album Whatever! in 2017. Marlene was the subject of Mundo ni Juan sa Japan, a television film documentary in 2015.

She has appeared in two Japanese films — Nantonaku (2007) and Karanukan (2017), where she played the character "Yukie".

Discography 

 Studio albums

Marlene with Threesome

 2016 Cubic Magic (Sony)
 2017 Whatever! (Sony)

 Marlene as guest artist

 1986 - Left Alone (Song) - Kyabare (Cabaret) Movie Soundtrack

References

External links
 Official site

1960 births
Living people
Japanese women singers
Filipino emigrants to Japan
Filipino jazz singers
20th-century Filipino women singers
Tagalog-language singers of Japan
21st-century Filipino women singers